Coleophora horakae is a moth of the family Coleophoridae. It is found in Australia from southern Queensland and the tablelands of New South Wales to the central part of the country.

Etymology
The species is dedicated to Dr. Marianne Horak.

References

Moths of Australia
horakae
Moths described in 1996